John Nugent may refer to:

 John Nugent (journalist) (1821–1880), journalist and agent of United States President James Buchanan
 John F. Nugent (1868–1931), United States Senator from Idaho
 John Cullen Nugent (1921–2014), Canadian sculptor
 John Nugent Fitch (1840–1927), botanical illustrator
 John Nugent (footballer), English-born footballer for Notts County
 John Dillon Nugent (1869–1940), Irish nationalist politician
 John Valentine Nugent (1796–1874), Irish-born educator, journalist and political figure in Newfoundland
 John Nugent, 5th Earl of Westmeath (1671–1754), Irish nobleman and soldier
 John P. Nugent, American labor organizer and politician from New York
 J. C. Nugent (John Charles Nugent, 1868–1947), American actor, director, and screenwriter